Songs Sacred and Profane is a song cycle for voice and piano composed in 192931 by John Ireland (18791962). (The John Ireland Trust gives a composition date of 1943, but appears to be in error unless the composer revised the work in that year.) It consists of settings of six poems by various poets.

A typical performance takes about 14 minutes. The songs are:

 "The Advent" (Alice Meynell (18471922); "Meditation", from Preludes (1875))
 "Hymn for a Child" (Sylvia Townsend Warner (18931978))
 "My Fair" (Meynell)
 "The Salley Gardens" (W. B. Yeats (18651939); "An Old Song Re-Sung", from The Wanderings of Oisin and Other Poems (1889))
 "The Soldier's Return" (Warner; from The Espalier (1925))
 "The Scapegoat" (Warner; from The Espalier)

References 

Song cycles by John Ireland
Classical song cycles in English
1931 compositions
Adaptations of works by W. B. Yeats